Anthony Standen (died 1993, age 86) was an American chemist and entomologist who wrote the popular book Science is a Sacred Cow (1950). He was born in 1906 to an American mother and a British father. He was educated at Oxford University, Massachusetts Institute of Technology, and the University of New Hampshire.

He believed that scientists and their theories should be subjected to the same scrutiny and criticism that other professionals face.

References

External links
 Pictures of Standen appeared alongside the March 27, 1950 Life magazine article (pages 103-114) "Science can be Silly: one of the select tosses a harpoon at the cult of the men in white coats." This article was also written by Standen wherein he excerpted passages from his book Science is a Sacred Cow: image 1 image 2

20th-century American chemists
20th-century American writers
1900s births
1993 deaths
Place of birth missing
Nationality missing
Alumni of the University of Oxford
Massachusetts Institute of Technology alumni
University of New Hampshire alumni